Minoa was a city on the north coast of ancient Crete, which belonged to the district of Lyctus, and stood on the narrowest part of the island, at a distance of 60 stadia from Hierapytna.

The site of Minoa is located near modern Pakheia Ammos.

References

Populated places in ancient Crete
Former populated places in Greece